Landscape with Windmill and Rainbow is a painting attributed to J.M.W. Turner, painted c. 1795–1800. It has the dimensions of 70.5 by 90.2 cm. It is believed to have been created at least partially in a painting by Thomas Gainsborough. It is held at the Tate Gallery, in London.

References

1790s paintings
Paintings by J. M. W. Turner
Rainbows in art
Collection of the Tate galleries